Baxter Preserve is an area of open space in North Salem, New York, United States. It consists of two segments, Baxter South and Baxter North. The preserve has become very popular in the region since being donated.

Baxter South

Baxter South land was donated to the North Salem Open Land Foundation (NSOLF) in 1979 by "The Baxter Road Group" and is by far the most popular and well-used of all the parcels owned by the NSOLF. Baxter South includes a large pond surrounded by the remains of a racetrack, and many trails, which are well traveled by people on foot and horseback. Many of these trails are lined with apple, black cherry, cottonwood, and maple trees.

History

Baxter North
It consists of a high meadow with a stand of trees at the northwest end and is an excellent spot for looking over the Baxter South parcel to the Titicus Reservoir.

References

Nature reserves in New York (state)
Protected areas of Westchester County, New York